Multicistronic message is an archaic term for Polycistronic.  Monocistronic, bicistronic and tricistronic are also used to describe mRNA with single, double and triple coding areas (exons). 

Note that the base word cistron is no longer used in genetics, and has been replaced by intron and exon in eukaryotic mRNA.  However, the mRNA found in bacteria is mainly polycistronic.  This means that a single bacterial mRNA strand can be translated into several different proteins.  This will occur if spacers separate the different proteins, and each spacer has to have a Shine-Dalgarno sequence located upstream of the start codon.

RNA